Prince Xun of the Second Rank, or simply Prince Xun, was the title of a princely peerage used in China during the Manchu-led Qing dynasty (1644–1912). As the Prince Xun peerage was not awarded "iron-cap" status, this meant that each successive bearer of the title would normally start off with a title downgraded by one rank vis-à-vis that held by his predecessor. However, the title would generally not be downgraded to any lower than a feng'en fuguo gong except under special circumstances.

The first bearer of the title was Yunti (1688–1756), the Kangxi Emperor's 14th son, who was granted the title "Prince Xun of the Second Rank" by the Qianlong Emperor in 1748. The title was passed down over seven generations and held by eight persons.

Members of the Prince Xun peerage

 Yunti (1688–1756), the Kangxi Emperor's 14th son, initially a beizi from 1709, promoted to junwang (second-rank prince) in 1723, demoted to beizi in 1724, stripped of his title in 1725, restored as a fuguo gong in 1737, promoted to beile in 1747, granted the title "Prince Xun of the Second Rank" in 1748, posthumously honoured as Prince Xunqin of the Second Rank (恂勤郡王)
 Hongchun (弘春; 1703–1739), Yunti's eldest son, initially a beizi, stripped of his title in 1724, restored as a feng'en zhenguo gong in 1726, promoted to beizi in 1728, promoted to beile in 1731, promoted to junwang as "Prince Tai of the Second Rank" (泰郡王) in 1733, demoted to beizi in 1734, stripped of his title in 1735
 Yongxin (永信; 1739–1806), Hongchun's eldest son
 Yongjin (永晉), Hongchun's son
 Mianbei (綿備), Yongjin's son
 Yishan (1790–1878), Mianbei's eldest son, held the title of a first class zhenguo jiangjun from 1847 to 1878
 Zaizhuo (載鷟), Yishan's second son, held the title of a third class fuguo jiangjun from 1851 to 1876
 Puhan (溥翰), Zaizhuo's eldest son, held the title of a third class fengguo jiangjun from 1857 to 1878, held the title of a third class fuguo jiangjun from 1878 to 1886
 Yuzhao (毓照), Puhan's third son, held the title of a third class fuguo jiangjun from 1887
 Hongming (弘明; 1705–1767), Yunti's second son, held the title of a beile from 1735 to 1767, posthumously honoured as Gongqin Beile (恭勤貝勒)
 Yongzhong (永忠; 1735–1793), Hongming's eldest son, held the title of a third class fuguo jiangjun from 1756 to 1793
 Miansuan (綿算), Yongzhong's fifth son, held the title of a third class fengguo jiangjun from 1793 to 1844, had no male heir
 Yongshuo (永碩; 1736–1808), Hongming's second son, held the title of a third class fuguo jiangjun from 1757 to 1767, promoted to beizi in 1767
 Mianling (綿齡; 1776–1824), Yongshuo's third son, held the title of a third class fuguo jiangjun from 1795 to 1808, promoted to feng'en zhenguo gong in 1808
 Yixing (奕興; 1812–1858), Mianling's fourth son, held the title of a feng'en zhenguo gong from 1824 to 1858
 Zaisen (載森; 1843–1887), Yixing's second son, held the title of a buru bafen zhenguo gong from 1858 to 1887
 Pubo (溥博; 1872–1894), Zaisen's eldest son, held the title of a buru bafen zhenguo gong from 1887 to 1894, had no male heir
 Puduo (溥多; 1879–?), Zaisen's second son, held the title of a buru bafen zhenguo gong from 1895, had no male heir
 Yubao (毓寶; 1903–?)
 Zaiguo (載國), Yixing's third son, held the title of a third class fuguo jiangjun from 1868 to 1895, had no male heir
 Mianzan (綿贊), Yongshuo's fourth son, held the title of a second class fuguo jiangjun from 1799 to 1818
 Yicheng (奕誠), Mianzan's eldest son
 Zaigui (載桂), Yicheng's eldest son, held the title of a second class fengguo jiangjun from 1818 to 1866
 Yipu (奕譜), Mianzan's second son, held the title of a fengguo jiangjun from 1821 to 1834, had no male heir
 Yiqia (奕洽), Mianzan's third son, held the title of a fengguo jiangjun from 1824 to 1868
 Zaihe (載荷), Yiqia's eldest son, held the title of a feng'en jiangjun from 1857 to 1885, had no male heir
 Zaishen (載申), Yiqia's second son, held the title of a feng'en jiangjun from 1864
 Puxi (溥錫), Zaishen's eldest son, held the title of a feng'en jiangjun from 1918
 Mianbang (綿榜), Yongshuo's fifth son, held the title of a third class fuguo jiangjun from 1799 to 1822, stripped of his title in 1822
 Mianmo (綿默), Yongshuo's sixth son, held the title of a feng'en jiangjun from 1799 to 1854
 Yiban (奕班), Mianmo's eldest son, held the title of a feng'en jiangjun from 1854 to 1875, had no male heir
 Mian'ao (綿翺), Yongshuo's seventh son, held the title of a feng'en jiangjun from 1809 to 1829, stripped of his title in 1829
 Mianxiang (綿翔), Yongshuo's eighth son, held the title of a feng'en jiangjun from 1812 to 1822
 Yicui (奕萃), Mianxiang's eldest son, held the title of a feng'en jiangjun from 1823 to 1858
 Zaice (載策), Yicui's eldest son, held the title of a feng'en jiangjun from 1858 to 1878, had no male heir
 Yongtian (永恬), Hongming's third son, held the title of a first class fengguo jiangjun from 1757 to 1767
 Mianxu (綿旭), Yongtian's eldest son, held the title of a feng'en jiangjun from 1767 to 1813
 Yimei (奕湄), Mianxu's eldest son, held the title of a feng'en jiangjun from 1813 to 1826
 Yidao (奕道), Mianxu's fourth son, held the title of a feng'en jiangjun from 1827 to 1844, had no male heir
 Yongti (永梯), Hongming's fourth son, held the title of a first class fengguo jiangjun from 1762 to 1790
 Miankuan (綿欵), Yongti's eldest son, held the title of a feng'en jiangjun from 1790 to 1826
 Yipu (奕樸), Miankuan's eldest son, held the title of a feng'en jiangjun from 1826 to 1859
 Zaitun (載屯), Yipu's eldest son, held the title of a feng'en jiangjun from 1827 to 1881, had no male heir

Family tree

See also
 Royal and noble ranks of the Qing dynasty

References
 

Qing dynasty princely peerages